Redkin is a Russian masculine surname, its feminine counterpart is Redkina. Notable people with the surname include:

Andrei Redkin (born 1972), Russian footballer
Evgeny Redkin (born 1970), Russian biathlete
Mark Redkin (1908–1987), Soviet photographer
Mykola Redkin (born 1928), Ukrainian hammer thrower

Russian-language surnames